Matej Peternel (born 22 August 1992) is a Slovenian football midfielder who plays for Zarica Kranj.

References

External links
PrvaLiga profile 
Nogomania profile 

1992 births
Living people
Slovenian footballers
Association football midfielders
NK Triglav Kranj players
Slovenian PrvaLiga players